The Martin Luther King Jr. Memorial Library (MLKML) is the central facility of the District of Columbia Public Library (DCPL), it was constructed and named in honor of the American civil rights leader Dr. Martin Luther King Jr. It is located in the 901 G St. NW Downtown (Washington, D.C.), with its main entrance between 9th and 10th St. in the opposite corner of Gallery Place station, and the Smithsonian American Art Museum, it serves also Chinatown, Washington, D.C., Mount Vernon Square and Penn Quarter neighborhoods.

History

Architect Ludwig Mies van der Rohe designed the 400,000 square foot (37,000 m2) steel, brick, and glass structure, and it is a rare example of modern architecture in Washington, D.C., this library was Mies's only public library, and his only building constructed in Washington, D.C.

Construction

The building was completed in 1972 at a cost of $18 million. By the early 2000s, years of deferred facility maintenance were widely apparent.

On June 28, 2007, the District of Columbia’s Historic Preservation Review Board designated this building a historic landmark. The designation, which applies to the exterior as well as interior spaces, seeks to preserve Mies' original design while allowing the library necessary flexibility to operate as a contemporary library facility. It was listed on the National Register of Historic Places in 2007.

The building's lobby includes a large mural of Dr. Martin Luther King Jr. created by artist Don Miller.

Prior to 1972, Washington's central library was a 1903 Andrew Carnegie-funded building located in Mount Vernon Square. That building was used by the University of the District of Columbia and the Historical Society of Washington, D.C., and is currently occupied by an Apple store.

Renovation

Mecanoo architecture firm was elected to renovate the library, the renovation process started on March 4, 2017, the building underwent a $211 million renovation, the library reopened in 2020 after 3.5 years of renovations. The entire interior was completely redone and included a new auditorium, dance studio, recording studios, tool library, offices, and a rooftop garden.

Covid-19

After the renovation, the library reopened its doors with limited services, and closed its doors again following a phased management of the pandemic, it has been a center for COVID-19 testings and distributions of masks as a contribution in the city's efforts against COVID-19 propagation, while at the same time served the patrons needs.

Accessibility 

The library follows Accessibility regulations in accordance with Americans with Disabilities Act of 1990 (ADA):

 Doors and elevators Wheelchair accessible in every floor.
 One Topaz HD magnifier that allow users with impaired vision to read documents with small fonts in the font size most convenient from them, it includes a brightness dial, a magnification dial, a color dial, its ergonomic design allows choose the screen's height and orientation, while the tray allows the smooth movement of the texts, the lock button can be used to read, hold or write documents.
 ADA computers for persons with visual impairment or physical disabilities.
 Four wide elevators for patrons and more elevators for staff use.
 One restrooms for each gender in 2nd, 3rd, 4th and 5th floors and two family restrooms with baby changing stations located in the 5th floor.
 Air conditioning to cool the library in summer and heat pumps to warm it in winter, and ventilation on every floor.
 Proper lightning for reading.
 2 set of stairs are located in the front of the building and 2 more set of stairs are located in the back of the building that can also be used in case of fire or outages.

Collections

The Martin Luther King Jr. Memorial Library houses several of the library system's special collections.

First floor: New books, DVDs and Audiobook s

On the first floor can be borrowed new books, movies, television series and audio books.

Second floor: Children collection, teen collection and Center for Accessibility

The second floor contains three main sections and also study rooms:

 Children collection: Contains books for early readers, also DVD movies, audio book and other materials that can be used at the place or borrowed by the patrons. it includes an exit to the wooden slide for children that allows them to slide down to the first floor and entrance.
 Alma Thomas Teen Space: Is a space for study and work, it counts with armchairs, chairs and tables, books, graphic novels and four computers where teenagers can do their works. It was named after African-American artist Alma Thomas,
 The Center for Accessibility: It is located in the west section, room 215 has Braille magazines and specialists in adaptive technologies to assist disabled people.

Third floor: Reading rooms 

It counts with to main reading rooms, and study rooms and collaborative spaces in between the main reading rooms.

The East book reading room with magazines and other materials.

The Grand reading rooms (west reading room), it holds a collection of books for adults and tables and chairs for independent or collaborative reading or work.

Fourth floor: History collection and Special collections and exhibitions

The Washingtoniana collection includes books, newspaper archives, maps, census records, and oral histories related to the city's history with 1.3 million photographs from the Washington Star newspaper and the theatrical video collections of the Washington Area Performing Arts Video Archive.

The Black Studies Center was established along with the MLK Library in 1972 to collect documents related to the African diaspora focusing on African American culture.
Fist itt

Services

Computers 

The library count with 31 computers with internet access and office applications that can be used for 70 minutes that could be renewed indefinitely if no other patron is on wait list for the same terminal, and 8 guest terminals that can be used temporarily for up to 15 minutes.

Meeting and study rooms

Meeting and study rooms can be reserved at any information desk at the day of use and also can be reserved in advance online. The maxiumum hours of use for a study room is 3 hours, two times a day. Staff will open the room with a key and if the user exit the room should ask information desk to reopen the room. The light controls of the rooms include three buttons, one that turns the light on, one that turns the light off and one that regulates the intensity of the light, some of the study rooms include projector and a screen or a monitor where a laptop can be connected through an HDMI cable and can also receive signal from cloud software that enables the display of content throughout WiFi or Ethernet networks, these allow patrons to use a bigger screen for their study or conference sessions. Other available spaces could be rented: the Auditorium, Circulation Space, Event Space, Great Hall, Great Hall East, Great Hall Informal Performance, Great Hall West.

On floor one could be reserved meeting rooms 105-B to 105-E Meeting Rooms (with 2-6 Person Capacity)

On 2nd floors could be reserved meeting rooms 201-I to 201-L and Accessibility Program Rooms 205-A and 205-B.

On 3rd floor could be reserved meeting and study rooms: 302-A to 302-L.

4th floor: Conference rooms on 4th floor, rooms 401-A to 401 G and at the Local History Center (The People's Archive): 405 Tables 1 to 12.

Center for Accessibility

The Center for Accessibility provides customers with disabilities equal access to library resources and services:

 Library staff provides disability-related cultural programming, 
 Book clubs, 
 Accessible game nights throughout the year.
 Classes in American Sign Language and Assistive Technology. 
 DC Talking Book & Braille Program - National Library Service for the Blind and Print Disabled (NLS) 
 Library by Mail (Formerly LSTAR).
 Classes on Assistive Technology: AWS (screen reader for Windows), VoiceOver (Screen reader for apple products) and TalkBack (Accessible tool and screen reader for Android devices).
 Beginning braille classes, among others.

Hotspot

The library offers free Wi-Fi accessible by personal computers and cellphones that support Wi-Fi connectivity.

Printers and scanners
The library include 2 printers and offer library patrons 20 free color or black pages, and also include scanning services.

Online services and mobile applications

The library offer an online catalog of it materials,

Mobile phone charging stations

The library include 6 charging station for mobile phones and other equipment equipment on second floor and 6 charging stations on the third floor, each one with a USB port and wall connectors, the stations do not include USB charging cable, therefore patrons should bring their own USB cable. Wall and floor power connectors are also available to charge laptops and other personal equipment in reading rooms and working tables. Mobile phones can also be charged on the computers USB ports while the patron are working on them.

Self-checkout Kiosks

Four self-checkout Kiosks that allow patrons to borrow materials are located on the first floor.

Income tax help

The Library host income tax return preparation for qualified residents.

Passport acceptance center

The library staff explains patrons how to Apply for a NEW Passport and how to renew a passport.

The Auditorium 
The Auditorium is located in Floor five, it is a 291-person state-of-the art theater in the city's flagship library has hosted live performances, lectures, and film screenings, including performances by the National Museum of the United States Navy's band and Wolf Trap Opera's world premiere of BORN FREE by Edward W. Hardy.

The DC Public Library Foundation (DCPLF) received a $2.7 million donation from Jeff Bezos to support Beyond the Book, the extension of Books From Birth; one of the DC Public Library's most important and beloved literacy programs for young children. Bezos’ donation is the largest ever received by the foundation in its 35-year history. As a means to recognize Bezos's $2.7 million donation, DCPL Director Richard Reyes-Gavilan recommended naming the auditorium after him. This received criticism from council members such as Charles Allen, and D.C.’s shadow representative to Congress Oye Owolewa.

Marianne's Cafe

DC Central Kitchen runs Mariannes cafe is located on the first floor, it offers coffee, bread and other meals. Marianne's cafe occasionally offer catering in collaboration with Chef José Andrés’ ThinkFoodGroup.

Drinking fountain

Many drinking fountains are located in every floor of the library.

Restrooms 

Library public restrooms are located all the building floors except the first floors, they include gendered restrooms and family restrooms.

Terrace and garden

The terrace and gardens are located in the fifth floor, they surround the Auditorium. It includes a garden with a view of a section of Chinatown and G, H and 9th St at open air, it includes an outdoor space under a roof with tables and chairs to be used by the public where patrons can work and enjoy the fresh air and the surrounding environment without interruptions or having to go indoors when rains or snows. It is located over the roof of fourth floor.

The Labs (Level A)

The laboratories or labs is another space where patrons ex-change their traditional role of the consumers and instead can become the creators of their works.  The Labs are currently located under the first floor, in the level A of the library and they are accessible from the 2 frontal elevators and also through the stairs.

In July 2013 the DC Public Library opened the Digital Commons area on the second floor, it included a 3-D printer, an Espresso Book Machine, computers, and a "Dream Lab" composed of meeting spaces and cubicles with devices for collaborative work, it was created to attract startup companies and community organizations without permanent offices to use wireless Internet, DVD players, projectors, and Smart Boards. During the renovation the Digital Commons was renamed to the Labs and were moved to the Level A of the library. The lab count with the following services:

 Twelve computers restricted for design and audiovisual production applications that include adobe creative suite and Cura, among others.
 A studio lab for video edition, podcast and blogging.
 A editing room where patrons can create their projects and also design their 3D objects with the Tinkercad, sketchup, openscad and blender, and also Cura software to print their work.

Studio Lab  

The studio lab offer patrons a 30-minute safety orientation, after which one they could reserve an available session in any of the labs where they should take an equipment certification and safety classes during their first session in each Lab. The studio lab offer the following services:

 Audio Recording Studio (3 hour sessions)
 Band, Green Screen, Photography or Voice Practice Studio (2 hour Sessions)
 Dance Studio Session (3 hours sessions with up to 2 per month).
 Universal Laser Systems
 Sewing Machines, among other labs.

DIY Memory Lab  
 A DIY Memory Lab Transfer Session, it is received In-person. This memory lab that teach patrons how to digitalize or preserve their recorded memories.

Fab Labs 

The fabrication labs or Fab Labs is another space in the Labs where patrons can create their own works. The process of use the Fab Labs requires a free membership for patrons 13 years or older. It can take more than one day to use a machine in case that there is not available spots, therefore is recommended to reserve online the classes and machines before their visit to review if there are laboratories available, patrons also can walk-in and ask if there is any session that got cancelled and use a laboratory for the remaining of the session time.

3D printing: The labs count with four Ultramaker 3 3D printers that allow patrons to print their own designed 3D objects. The process for the printing of patrons first object could take more than one day since it requires take the 3D printing class and also the introduction to the printer, and safety course before they are patron are allowed to reserve a printer time that can last up to 2 hours. Users should bring their own USB memory or hard drive, since the objects should be loaded or saved in the a USB memory from which the objects will be transferred to the 3D printers. The software used is Cura, the file type used is stereolithography or .slt. The cost of printing is 5 cents per gram of 3D objects designed, resulting in objects with a price on the range of 5 cents to 20 dollars, depending on the size of the object.

Clubs

MLKML holds many official club meetings that are announced in tis website as part of patron services, some of them are the following:

 MLK Chess Club: A club for chess players of all ages and skill levels that have meetings the second Saturday of every month between 2:00 P.M. and 3:30 P.M. on room 401E
 Board Game Club: An after school board game club for children's.
 Anime Manga Club: A club for anime fans for discussions, activities and trailer screenings that meets the second and fourth Saturday of each month between 2:00 P.M. and 5:00 P.M. on room 401.

See also
District of Columbia Public Library
Martin Luther King Jr.
Library of Congress
List of memorials to Martin Luther King Jr.
Dr. Martin Luther King Jr. Library
Martin Luther King Jr. Memorial

References

External links

Martin Luther King Jr. Memorial Library

Library buildings completed in 1972
Libraries on the National Register of Historic Places in Washington, D.C.
Public libraries in Washington, D.C.
Ludwig Mies van der Rohe buildings
Penn Quarter
1972 establishments in Washington, D.C.